Denman is an unincorporated community in Buffalo County, Nebraska, United States.

History
A post office was established at Denman in 1914, and remained in operation until it was discontinued in 1956. Denman was named for Francis Marion Denman, the original owner of the town site.

References

Unincorporated communities in Buffalo County, Nebraska
Unincorporated communities in Nebraska